Croton triacros is a species of plants of the genus Croton and the family of Euphorbiaceae, found in north-east Queensland.

External links
 

triacros
Flora of Queensland
Taxa named by Ferdinand von Mueller